Carlos Isturiz (born 2 May 1960) is a Venezuelan diver. He competed in the men's 3 metre springboard event at the 1984 Summer Olympics.

References

External links
 

1960 births
Living people
Venezuelan male divers
Olympic divers of Venezuela
Divers at the 1984 Summer Olympics
Place of birth missing (living people)